Chaplygin is a town and the administrative center of Chaplyginsky District in Lipetsk Oblast, Russia, located at the confluence of the Stanovaya Ryasa and Yagodnaya Ryasa Rivers,  north of Lipetsk, the administrative center of the oblast. Population:

History
The settlement of Ust Stanovykh Ryas was founded on the territory of modern Chaplygin in the first half of the 17th century. It later grew into the village (selo) of Slobodskoye. In 1695, Peter the Great built a small wooden palace in the vicinity, and in 1702 a small fortress under the name of Oranienburg. The name, originally taken from that of the German town Oranienburg, was modified to Raninburg and later to Ranenburg. Also in 1702, both the fortress and the village of Slobodskoye were granted to Alexander Menshikov, who built a small monastery here in 1712.

Town status was granted to Ranenburg in 1778. In 1948, it was renamed Chaplygin after the Russian physicist Sergey Chaplygin, who was born here in 1869.

Administrative and municipal status
Within the framework of administrative divisions, Chaplygin serves as the administrative center of Chaplyginsky District. As an administrative division, it is incorporated within Chaplyginsky District as Chaplygin Town Under District Jurisdiction. As a municipal division, Chaplygin Town Under District Jurisdiction is incorporated within Chaplyginsky Municipal District as Chaplygin Urban Settlement.

Economy
Food industry is the main sector of economy.

References

Notes

Sources

External links
Official website of Chaplygin 
Chaplygin Business Directory 

Cities and towns in Lipetsk Oblast
Ranenburgsky Uyezd